Breeding Nunatak is an isolated nunatak  northeast of the Allegheny Mountains in the Ford Ranges of Marie Byrd Land. It was mapped by the United States Geological Survey from surveys and from U.S. Navy air photos, 1959–65, and named by the Advisory Committee on Antarctic Names for George H. Breeding, storekeeper, U.S. Navy, of Byrd Station, 1967.

References 

Nunataks of Marie Byrd Land
Ford Ranges